The Zeta Banovina, was a province (banovina) of the Kingdom of Yugoslavia between 1929 and 1941. This province consisted of all of present-day Montenegro as well as adjacent parts of Central Serbia, Croatia, Kosovo and Bosnia and Herzegovina. It was named after the Zeta River which also gave its name to the medieval state of Zeta that roughly corresponds to modern-day Montenegro. The capital of Banovina was Cetinje.

Borders
According to the 1931 Constitution of the Kingdom of Yugoslavia,

History
In 1939, predominantly Catholic areas of the Zeta Banovina from the Konavle to Pelješac including Dubrovnik were merged with a new Banovina of Croatia.

World War II
In 1941, the World War II Axis Powers occupied the remaining area of the Zeta Banovina. A small area around the Gulf of Kotor was annexed by Fascist Italy while much of the rest was joined with Italian-occupied Montenegro and Albania. Eastern areas were made part of German-occupied Serbia and western areas part of Independent State of Croatia.

Following World War II, the region was divided between Montenegro, Bosnia and Herzegovina, Serbia, and Croatia within a federal Socialist Yugoslavia.

Demographics
According to the 1931 census, the Zeta Banovina had a population of 925,516 and an area of 30,997 km2.

Cities and towns

Cetinje (capital)
Andrijevica
Berane
Bijelo Polje
Bileća
Danilovgrad
Dubrovnik (1939 to the Banovina of Croatia)
Đakovica
Foča
Gacko
Istok
Kolašin
Kotor
Ljubinje
Mitrovica
Nevesinje
Nikšić
Nova Varoš
Novi Pazar
Orahovac
Peć
Pljevlja
Podgorica
Priboj
Prijepolje
Raška
Sjenica
Srbica
Stari Bar
Šavnik
Tivat
Trebinje
Tutin
Ulcinj

List of Bans of Zeta

See also
Zeta Oblast (1919-1929)
Zeta (medieval principality)
Montenegro (sovereign state)

References

The Constitution of the Kingdom of Yugoslavia

Banovinas of the Kingdom of Yugoslavia
Yugoslav Croatia
Yugoslav Serbia
Yugoslav Bosnia and Herzegovina
20th century in Montenegro
Geographic history of Bosnia and Herzegovina
Modern history of Kosovo
1929 establishments in Yugoslavia
1941 disestablishments in Yugoslavia
1941 disestablishments in Montenegro
Zeta (historical region)
Former subdivisions of Bosnia and Herzegovina